The Penikese Island Leper Hospital was a leprosy hospital located on Penikese Island, off the coast of Massachusetts, United States, from 1905 to 1921. It housed a small colony of people who suffered from leprosy over the years until it was closed in 1921 and patients were relocated to a federal hospital in Louisiana.

External links
The tragedy of Penikese Island
Penikese Island Cemetery at Findagrave.com
Outcasts: The Penikese Island Leper Hospital 1905-1921

Hospital buildings completed in 1905
Defunct hospitals in Massachusetts
Leper hospitals
Leprosy in the United States
1905 establishments in Massachusetts